Courtney Scott Deifel (born Courtney Lynn Scott; November 24, 1980) is an American former collegiate softball catcher and current head coach at Arkansas.

Career
Deifel played college softball for the California Golden Bears from 2000 to 2003, winning a national championship in 2002, and batting .263 (218/827) with 13 home runs and 127 RBIs for her career.

Head Coaching Record

References

1980 births
Living people
Female sports coaches
American softball coaches
California Golden Bears softball players
Arkansas Razorbacks softball coaches
Maryland Terrapins softball coaches
Louisville Cardinals softball coaches
Oklahoma Sooners softball coaches
Sportspeople from Clovis, California
People from Merced, California
Softball players from California
Sports coaches from California